Gyula Barátky (14 May 1910 – 14 April 1962) was an ethnic Hungarian football player who represented both Hungary and Romania internationally. His preferred position was the half right.

He played a total of 155 games in the national Romanian championships (scoring 100 goals), starting on 10 September 1933 (Venus București – Crișana Oradea 0–1). He won four Romanian Cups in 1937, 1939, 1940, 1941, all with Rapid București.

He debuted in the Hungary national football team in 1930, and played nine games with no goals scored. In 1933, he started to play for the Romania national football team, for which he played 20 games and scored 13 goals. He appeared in the 1938 World Cup, scoring a goal against Cuba.

After his last game (Oțelul Reșița – RATA Târgu Mureș 5–3), he coached RATA Târgu Mureș for a while and, for a very short term, the Romania national team.

Stories about his skills are still a source of pride for Rapid București supporters. Hundreds of thousands read Finala se joacă azi ("The final is played today") or Glasul roților de tren ("Voice of the train wheels"), written by Ioan Chirilă, an important Romanian sports writer, in which Barátky plays a central role.

Honours

Player
Hungária
Magyar Kupa (1): 1931–32
Rapid București
Cupa României (6): 1936–37, 1937–38, 1938–39, 1939–40, 1940–41, 1941–42

Coach
Rapid București
Cupa României (2): 1940–41, 1941–42
Dinamo București
Cupa României (1): 1958–59

References

External links

 
 
 Iuliu Baratky, minunea blondă a Giuleștiului 
 România și Ungaria și-au disputat minunea blondă

1910 births
1962 deaths
Sportspeople from Oradea
People from the Kingdom of Hungary
Romanian footballers
Hungarian footballers
Romanian sportspeople of Hungarian descent
Hungary international footballers
Romania international footballers
Romanian football managers
Dual internationalists (football)
1934 FIFA World Cup players
1938 FIFA World Cup players
Liga I players
Association football forwards
Stăruința Oradea players
CA Oradea players
MTK Budapest FC players
Crișana Oradea players
FC Rapid București players
FC Carmen București players
CS Târgu Mureș players
FC Rapid București managers
CA Oradea managers
FC Universitatea Cluj managers
Romania national football team managers
FC Dinamo București managers